The Lewis Center for Educational Research (LCER) is an educational organization located in Apple Valley, California.  It is the parent organization of The Academy for Academic Excellence (AAE), the only research charter school in the state of California. The Lewis Center has a working educational relationship with NASA and operationally manages the Goldstone-Apple Valley Radio Telescope. The Lewis Center has three sites throughout Apple Valley:

The Mojave River Campus: Grades 5-12
The Corwin Campus: Grades 2-4
The Thunderbird Campus: Grades Kindergarten-1

External links
Lewis Center for Educational Research

Buildings and structures in San Bernardino County, California
1990 establishments in California
Education in San Bernardino County, California